The Memorial Marco Pantani is a professional road bicycle race held annually in Emilia-Romagna, Italy.

History
The race has been organized since 2004 and serves as a memory of Marco Pantani. The race starts in Cesenatico, Pantani's hometown, and follows a route towards his birthplace, Cesena. In 2007 the race was organised as a 1.1 event on the UCI Europe Tour. In 2013, the race was merged with the Giro della Romagna, a race in the same region.

After Gilberto Simoni won the 2005 edition of the race, he paid tribute to Pantani's memory by saying:

Winners

References

External links
 

UCI Europe Tour races
Cycle races in Italy
Recurring sporting events established in 2004
2004 establishments in Italy